Jonesville is an unincorporated community located within the town of Richmond in Chittenden County, Vermont, United States.

The post office in Jonesville uses the ZIP code 05466.

References

Richmond, Vermont
Unincorporated communities in Vermont
Unincorporated communities in Chittenden County, Vermont